The 2012 Valencia GP3 Series round was the third round of the 2012 GP3 Series season. It was held on June 24–26, 2012 at Valencia Street Circuit, Valencia, Spain. The race was used to support the 2012 European Grand Prix.

Classification

Qualifying

Notes:
 — António Félix da Costa was removed from the results of the qualifying due to a technical infringement. 
 — Conor Daly received a 10 place grid penalty the race before for causing an avoidable red flag.

Race 1

Race 2

Notes:
 — Tio Ellinas was given a one-second time penalty added to his race result after contact between him and Kevin Ceccon, dropping him from third to fifth. 
 — António Félix da Costa had a ten place grid penalty for the sprint race after causing an avoidable collision in the sprint race.

Standings after the round

Drivers' Championship standings

Teams' Championship standings

 Note: Only the top five positions are included for both sets of standings.

See also 
 2012 European Grand Prix
 2012 Valencia GP2 Series round

References

Valencia
Valencia